is a five-member Japanese alternative rock band from Okinawa formed in 2008. The band is signed to A-Sketch Music Label and have currently released five studio albums, two extended plays, four single albums, and ten singles. They are best known for performing the opening theme song of the anime Noragami, . In November 2018, the band announced their hiatus. The band resumed activity in September of 2021.

Members
Hello Sleepwalkers consists of:
  — vocals, guitar, leader
  — guitar, vocals
  — guitar
  — bass
  — drums

Discography

Studio albums

Extended plays

Singles

Filmography

Soundtrack appearances

Music videos

References

External links

Hello Sleepwalkers Discography

Japanese alternative rock groups
Japanese rock music groups
Musical quintets
Musical groups established in 2008
Musical groups from Okinawa Prefecture
2008 establishments in Japan